Jet Airways flew to a total of 55 destinations including 36 domestic destination within India and 19 international destinations including both intercontinental and within the extended neighbourhood in Asia as of  . The list includes the country (state), city and the airport's name, with the airline's hubs marked.

List
As of 17 April 2019, Jet Airways under economic crisis has suspended all its operations, till further notice. Hence, operations across all its previous destinations on network stand suspended.

References

Lists of airline destinations